= Mehndiganj, Uttar Pradesh, Lucknow =

Locality in Lucknow

Mehndiganj, Uttar Pradesh, Lucknow is situated in old Lucknow. It is a locality in Lucknow. There is also a "chauraha" called "Mehndiganj bada chauraha". Members of all religions – Hindus, Muslims, Christians and Sikhs live here harmoniously. There is a temple nearby called the "Shitla Devi Temple".
